This is a list of novels, light novels, manga, manhwa, anime, films and video games according to the role isekai (portal fantasy) plays in them.


Novels and light novels

Anime and manga

Digimon series

Manhwa

Video games

References

Lists of anime by genre
Lists of films by genre
Lists of manga by genre
List of
Isekai
List of
List of
List of
List of